Endometriosis Society of India is a voluntary non-profit organisation that works to create awareness about endometriosis, training caregivers and service providers for better management of the condition and promoting research about endometriosis. Endometriosis is a benign yet progressive disease where the tissue that normally grows within the uterus grows outside of it – like on the ovaries, fallopian tubes or the external uterus. Its main symptoms are pelvic pain and infertility.

Origin 
The Endometriosis Society of India (ESI) was founded in 2003 by Dr. B. N. Chakravarty and Mr. Pramathes Das Mahapatra with five other colleagues in Kolkata, India.

Das Mahapatra in an article in Hindustan Times says, “While conditions like polycystic ovarian disorder (PCOD) are widely discussed, endometriosis is still not talked about. Most women don’t realize that they aren’t suffering alone.” In an effort to remedy the same, ESI has partnered with 350 doctors all over the country and organises conferences to discuss latest treatments possible in the field and create awareness in India where painful periods are generally considered normal.

Activities 
The Endometriosis Society of India conducts scientific seminars and undertakes research surveys. According to one of their surveys in 2006, the number of people suffering from endometriosis in India is 25 million.

In 2008, Endometriosis Society of India in collaboration with Department of Physiology, Indian Institute of Chemical Biology, Kolkata published a paper on 'Role of melatonin in regulating matrix metalloproteinase-9 via tissue inhibitors of metalloproteinase -1 during protection against endometriosis.' These papers added to the developing database of knowledge on endometriosis. Another paper from the same collaboration was published on 'Melatonin protects against endometriosis' in 2010.

References 

Medical and health organisations based in India
Endometriosis